William Pao (born 1967) is an oncologist and Executive Vice President and Chief Development Officer of Pfizer. He was previously the head of Pharma Research and Early Development (pRED) at Roche and a professor of medicine at the Vanderbilt University Medical Center. He is best known for his work in molecular oncology and cancer genomics.

Education
William Pao studied at Harvard University and earned his MD and PhD degrees in biology from Yale University. He then did his residency training at Weill Cornell Medical School and postdoctoral fellowship with Harold E. Varmus at the Memorial Sloan Kettering Cancer Center. During that time, he did pivotal research on the tyrosine kinase of the epidermal growth factor receptor gene which identified new molecular mechanisms of sensitivity of lung cancers to inhibitors.

Career and research
Pao started his career as a member of Memorial Sloan-Kettering Cancer Center. He joined Vanderbilt University as a professor in the Division of Hematology and Oncology eventually becoming head of the division and the personalized cancer medicine unit. He joined Roche as the global head of oncology disease and translational area in 2014. In 2018, he took over pRED replacing John Reed. In 2022, he joined Pfizer as Chief Development Officer.

Awards and honors
Pao is induced into the American Society for Clinical Investigations and the Association of American Physicians.

References

Living people
1967 births
Yale School of Medicine alumni
Harvard College alumni
Pfizer people
Vanderbilt University faculty
Molecular oncology
American oncologists